Torfopredpriyatiya Bolshoye is a rural locality (a settlement) in Kupriyanovskoye Rural Settlement, Gorokhovetsky District, Vladimir Oblast, Russia. The population was 162 as of 2010. There are 6 streets.

Geography 
Torfopredpriyatiya Bolshoye is located 16 km south of Gorokhovets (the district's administrative centre) by road. Sapunovo is the nearest rural locality.

References 

Rural localities in Gorokhovetsky District